Hsin Sheng College of Medical Care and Management (HSC) is a private junior college in Longtan District, Taoyuan City, Taiwan. As a junior college approved by Ministry of Education, it offers two-year curriculum for vocational high school graduates and five-year curriculum for junior high school graduates. Upon successful completion of the study, students receive associate degrees. In addition, it provides two-year vocational training for workers.

History
HSC was initially established in 1971 as Hsin Sheng Senior Medical Vocational School. In 2005, it was restructured and renamed to Hsin Sheng College of Medical Care and Management.

Teaching units
 Department of Nursing
 Department of Early Childhood Care and Education
 Department of Styling and Cosmetology
 Department of Marketing
 Department of International Business
 Department of Health and Leisure Management
 Department of Applied English
 Department of Applied Japanese
 Department of Long-term Care
 Department of Optometry

Notable alumni
 Esther Huang, actress and singer
 Xiao Xun, member of Hey Girl

See also
 List of universities in Taiwan
 Education in Taiwan

Notes

References

External links
 Hsin Sheng College of Medical Care and Management 

1971 establishments in Taiwan
Educational institutions established in 1971
Universities and colleges in Taoyuan City
Universities and colleges in Taiwan
Technical universities and colleges in Taiwan